{{Infobox album
| name         = The First Step: Treasure Effect
| type         = studio
| artist       = Treasure
| cover        = The First Step Treasure Effect.jpg
| caption      = Digital and Blue version cover
| alt          = 
| released     = 
| studio       = YG (Seoul)
| genre        =
K-pop 
J-pop
dance
dance-pop
pop
rap
ballad
hip hop
| length       = 
| language     = Korean, Japanese
| label        = 
 YG
 YGEX
| producer     = 
 Future Bounce
 Millennium
 Q
 R.Tee
 Rovin
| prev_title   = The First Step: Chapter Three
| prev_year    = 2020
| next_title   = The Second Step: Chapter One
| next_year    = 2022
| misc         = {{Singles 
| name         = The First Step: Treasure Effect (Japan)'
| type         = studio 
| single1      = Beautiful
| single1date  = February 14, 2021 
}}
}}The First Step: Treasure Effect is the debut studio album by South Korean boy band Treasure. It was released on January 11, 2021, through YG Entertainment. The album was released for pre-order on December 29, 2020. A music video for the album's "My Treasure" was released alongside the album. The digital version of the album contains 10 tracks, while the CD version contains 12 tracks. The physical album comes in three versions: Blue, Green and Orange. The album is primarily a K-pop record that combines hip hop, dance, dance-pop, pop, rap and ballad elements. The First Step: Treasure Effect is the fourth and final installment of The First Step series, following the group's single albums The First Step: Chapter One, The First Step: Chapter Two and The First Step: Chapter Three, all released in 2020 - all 3 single albums' songs appear on The First Step: Treasure Effect, along with the group's pre-debut song "Going Crazy".

 Background 
On December 28, 2020, YG Entertainment uploaded a teaser poster through their official blog, confirming the title and release date of the album. On December 31, Treasure released the title poster for their album, revealing that the lead single is named "My Treasure". On January 4, 2021, YG revealed the track list for the album. Starting on January 5, a series of lyric posters with sentences from the lyrics of "My Treasure" were posted every day. The music video teaser for "My Treasure" was released on January 9. On March 31, the Japanese version was released, with "Beautiful" serving as the title track, and all other songs re-recorded in Japanese.

 Composition 
YG Entertainment explained that the lyrics of "My Treasure" contain "meaning that everyone is a unique treasure-like being, which gives a hopeful message of 'Let’s cheer up in hard times. The sun will rise and shine again tomorrow'" and added, "through the song 'My Treasure', we hope that the fans who have been supporting Treasure and people out there suffering will be consoled". YG further described "My Treasure" as a "bright and exciting pop song" that will "cheer up the listeners and make them feel better in these hard times". 

 Songs 
During the online press conference held by Treasure for the release of The First Step: Treasure Effect, the group described "My Treasure" as "a song carrying the message that we are all treasure-like beings. The intro piano melody and brass sounds create a harmony, making a cheerful mood". Written and composed by AKMU's Lee Chan-hyuk, "Slow Motion" "calmly progresses while incorporating bass and piano, expressing the theme of let’s go through this harsh world together while holding hands, slow but steady". "Be with Me" is a song with "whispers saying you should be with me together", and "Orange" is a song with "a retro vibe that sounds familiar yet fresh".

 Promotion The First Step: Treasure Effect was released worldwide on January 11, 2021 through YG in conjunction with the music video for "My Treasure". In celebration of their comeback, the group held an online press conference 2 hours before the release to talk about the album.

 Singles 
An accompanying music video for "My Treasure" was uploaded to Treasure’s YouTube channel simultaneously with the single's release. In 13 hours, the music video reached 3.5 million views. Treasure promoted the song with televised live performances on various South Korean music programs including M Countdown, Show! Music Core and Inkigayo.

 Commercial performance 
On January 12, "My Treasure" topped the Top Rising Chart of AWA, and "Going Grazy" also topped Rakuten Music’s Real-time Comprehensive Rankings. The First Step: Treasure Effect'' was ranked at number 1 on iTunes charts in 18 different countries, including Brazil, Hong Kong, Thailand, Singapore, Spain and India. The album was also ranked at number 2 on the Worldwide Albums chart. As of January 11, nearly 250,000 pre-orders were made on the album. On January 13, the album was ranked at number 1 on the real-time accumulated sales announced by Hanteo Charts in Korea.

Track listing

Korean version

Japanese version

Notes
 Not included in the standard edition of the CD.
 All tracks are stylized in all caps.

Charts

Weekly charts

Monthly charts

Year-end charts

Certifications and sales figures

Release history

Notes

References 

2021 albums
Treasure (band) albums
YG Entertainment albums
Korean-language albums

External links